Wanne may refer to:

Hampus Wanne (born 1993), Swedish handballer
Theo Wanne (born 1967), American saxophone manufacturer and saxophone mouthpiece designer
Wanne, Belgium, a village in the Belgian municipality of Trois-Ponts
Wanne, Germany, a borough of the German city of Tübingen
 Wanne, a settlement today part of Herne, North Rhine-Westphalia, Germany
Wanne (Möhne), a river in North Rhine-Westphalia, Germany, tributary of the Möhne
Wanne (Ruhr), a river in North Rhine-Westphalia, Germany, tributary of the Ruhr
De Wanne, former restaurant in the Netherlands

See also